Diamonds is a 1920 German silent crime film directed by Friedrich Feher and starring Louis Ralph, Erika Glässner, and Julius Brandt. A policeman goes undercover to unmask a customs officer as corrupt. Feher's direction was criticised for being too loose.

Cast
 Louis Ralph
 Erika Glässner
 Julius Brandt
 Paul Morgan

References

Bibliography
 

Films of the Weimar Republic
1920 films
German silent feature films
German crime films
Films directed by Friedrich Feher
1920 crime films
German black-and-white films
1920s German films
1920s German-language films